Maisie Rose Methuen (born 22 June 2001) is a retired artistic gymnast for Wales and Great Britain. 

Methuen represented Wales at the 2018 Commonwealth Games.

Career

Espoir

2014 
In March, Methuen won silver behind Latalia Bevan in the Espoir division of the Welsh Championships  and went on to be crowned the 2014 British Espoir Champion later that year.

Junior

2015 
Methuen won gold in the junior all-around at the 2015 Welsh Championships, and placed second behind Catherine Lyons in the junior division at the 2015 British Championships.

Representing Great Britain at the 2015 European Youth Olympic Festival in Tbilisi, Georgia, Methuen won a silver medal on balance beam.

2016 
Methuen was crowned the 2016 British Junior Champion.

At the 2016 European Women's Artistic Gymnastics Championships, Methuen won a silver medal with the team in the team final, placed fourth in the junior all-around final. She also qualified to the junior balance beam final where she placed fifth.

Senior

2017 
In her first Senior British Championships, Methuen won floor exercise gold. She won joint silver, with Alice Kinsella, in the all-around competition, with both gymnasts scoring 53.300.

Methuen also placed second all-around in her first Senior Welsh Championships.

2018 
In 2018, at the British Championships, Methuen placed seventh all-around,  and won a gold medal on balance beam.

Methuen was selected to represent Wales at the 2018 Commonwealth Games in the Gold Coast, Australia. Methuen placed fourth with the Welsh team in the team final and placed seventh individually in the all-around final.

Competitive history

References

2001 births
Living people
Sportspeople from Cardiff
Welsh female artistic gymnasts